Constantin Sotiropoulos is the co-creator (with François Lionet) of AMOS BASIC, a popular video game and multimedia programming language for the Amiga computer, and STOS BASIC on the Atari ST.
He has also been creator of copy protection software for some French companies.

References

French computer programmers
Living people
Year of birth missing (living people)
Place of birth missing (living people)